{{Album ratings
|rev1 = AllMusic
|rev1score = 
|rev2 = Okayplayer
|rev2score = 
|rev3 = PopMatters|rev3score = 
}}A Modern Way of Living with the Truth''''' is the fourth and final studio album by The Exies. It was released on May 15, 2007, by Eleven Seven Music.

Track listing 

The song "Lay Your Money Down" was featured on the "WWE Smackdown vs. Raw 2009" soundtrack, however was not released as a single.
The song “Dose” was featured on the “Baja: Edge of Control” soundtrack; however it was an instrumental version without any lyrics.

References

External links
The Official James Michael MySpace Site
"A Modern Way Of Living With The Truth" album lyrics

2007 albums
The Exies albums
Eleven Seven Label Group albums